Northern People's Congress (NPC) is a political party in Nigeria. Formed in June 1949, the party held considerable influence in the Northern Region from the 1950s until the military coup of 1966. It was formerly a cultural organization known as Jamiyaar Mutanem Arewa.

After the Nigerian Civil War of 1967, the NPC subsequently became a minor party. 

The leader of this party was the Sardauna of Sokoto who, also, was the Premier of the Northern Region, Sir Ahmadu Bello. Sir Alhaji Abubakar Tafawa Balewa was the deputy leader of the party and Prime Minister of Nigeria.
They produced the first prime minister whose office was created in 1957,and ruled throughout the first republic (1963–1966). 
Party member Makaman Bida later became leader of the National Party of Nigeria in 1978. S. A. Ajayi a party member was the Kwara state chairman of NPC, a former parliamentary Secretary to Sardauna of Sokoto.

See also
R. A. B. Dikko

References

Political parties established in 1949
Political parties in Nigeria
1949 establishments in Nigeria
Anti-communist parties